Mount Kammuri is a mountain  high standing  south-southeast of Mount Chōtō in the central part of the Langhovde Hills, on the coast of Queen Maud Land, Antarctica. It was mapped from surveys and air photos by the Japanese Antarctic Research Expedition (JARE), 1957–62. The name Kammuri-yama (Kanmuri Yama), meaning "crown mountain," was given by JARE Headquarters in 1973.

References

Mountains of Queen Maud Land
Prince Harald Coast